Marija Radojčić (born 1982) is a politician and entrepreneur in Serbia. She served in the Assembly of Vojvodina from 2008 to 2012 as a member of the League of Social Democrats of Vojvodina (LSV).

Early life and private career
Radojčić was born in Jazak, a village in the municipality of Irig, in what was then the Socialist Autonomous Province of Vojvodina in the Socialist Republic of Serbia in the Socialist Federal Republic of Yugoslavia. She attended the University of Novi Sad, graduating as an economist. Along with her family, she oversees a small farm and markets a brand of cheese called Friški jazački sirevi, which has received a citation from the Balkan Cheese Festival. She has also sponsored a series of "Business Café" events and has worked to promote female entrepreneurship and rural tourism.

Political career
Radojčić was elected to the Assembly of Vojvodina in the 2008 provincial election. She received the fortieth position on the LSV's Together for Vojvodina electoral list; the list was five proportional mandates, and she was subsequently chosen as one of her party's delegates. (Until 2012, mandates were distributed to candidates on successful lists at the discretion of the sponsoring party or coalition, and it was common practice for the mandates to be awarded out of numerical order; Radojčić's position on the list had no bearing on whether or not she received a mandate.) The LSV participated in Vojvodina's executive council during this period, and Radojčić served as a supporter of the executive. During her time in the assembly, she was noted for working on projects related to the advancement of women's rights in the province.

She sought re-election in the 2012 provincial election as a candidate in the single-member Irig constituency seat and was not returned. Vojvodina subsequently abolished its constituency seats and adopted a system of pure proportional representation, with mandates awarded in numerical order to candidates on successful lists. Radojčić received the forty-fifth position on the LSV's list in the 2016 provincial election and was not elected when the list won nine mandates. She was also a LSV candidate in the 2012, 2014, and 2016 Serbian parliamentary elections, though she was not elected on any of these occasions.

Radojčić has also served in the Irig municipal assembly. In 2007, she was a spokesperson for the municipality in talks with UNESCO over designating Fruška Gora as a World Heritage Site.

Electoral record

Provincial (Vojvodina)

References

1982 births
Living people
People from Irig, Serbia
Serbian women in politics
Members of the Assembly of Vojvodina
League of Social Democrats of Vojvodina politicians